Kromna may refer to:
Kromna (Arcadia), town in ancient Arcadia, Greece
Kromna (Corinthia), town in ancient Corinthia, Greece
 Kromna (Paphlagonia), a town of ancient Paphlagonia, now in Turkey
 Amasra, a possible site of the Paphlagonian town
 Kurucaşile, a possible site of the Paphlagonian town